The Col de Crête Sèche (French: "dry ridge pass") is a mountain pass in the Alps, located between Switzerland and Italy. It connects Fionnay in the Swiss canton of Valais on its northern side to Bionaz in the Italian region of the Aosta Valley on its southern side. The Col de Crête Sèche is the second-lowest pass between the valleys of Bagnes and Valpelline, after the Fenêtre de Durand which lies about one hundred metres lower west of Mont Gelé.

The pass is traversed by a trail, the Swiss side involving a much longer approach than the Italian side.

References

External links
Col de Crête Sèche on Hikr

Mountain passes of Switzerland
Mountain passes of Italy
Mountain passes of the Alps
Mountain passes of Valais
Mountain passes of Aosta Valley
Italy–Switzerland border crossings